Liochirus cycloderus is a species of beetles in the family Carabidae, the only species in the genus Liochirus.

References

Harpalinae
Monotypic Carabidae genera